Rob Duncan Coalson from the University of Pittsburgh, was awarded the status of Fellow in the American Physical Society, after they were nominated by their Division of Chemical Physics in 1999, for novel contributions to the theory of condensed phase quantum dynamics, including computational methodology and applications to optical spectroscopy and electron transfer; and for theoretical insights into macroion electrostatics, with applications to colloidal suspensions and crystals.

References 

Fellows of the American Physical Society
American physicists
Living people
Year of birth missing (living people)